The 1986 Pretty Polly Classic  was a women's tennis tournament played on indoor carpet court at the Brighton Centre in Brighton, England that was part of the 1986 Virginia Slims World Championship Series. It was the ninth edition of the tournament and was held from 20 October until 26 October 1986. First-seeded Steffi Graf won the singles title and earned $40,000 first-prize money.

Finals

Singles
 Steffi Graf defeated  Catarina Lindqvist 6–3, 6–3
 It was Graf's 8th singles title of the year and of her career.

Doubles
 Steffi Graf /  Helena Suková defeated  Tine Scheuer-Larsen /  Catherine Tanvier 6–4, 6–4

References

External links
 International Tennis Federation (ITF) tournament event details
 Tournament draws

Pretty Polly Classic
Pretty Polly Classic
Brighton International
Pretty Polly Classic